Valerie Yuryevich Sinitsin (born 17 March 1992) is a Russian former ice dancer. With partner Valeria Zenkova, he won five ISU Junior Grand Prix medals, including one gold, and placed fourth at the 2013 World Junior Championships. They are the 2013 Russian junior champions.

Career 
Zenkova and Sinitsin won the bronze medal at the 2008–2009 ISU Junior Grand Prix in Mexico City and placed 10th at the 2008 Russian Junior Championships. In mid-2011, they changed coaches from Ksenia Rumiantseva and Elena Tchaikovskaia to Alexander Zhulin and Oleg Volkov. They won silver and bronze medals during the 2011–12 ISU Junior Grand Prix season. They then competed at the 2012 Russian Junior Championships and won the bronze medal.

In the 2012–2013 Junior Grand Prix season, Zenkova / Sinitsin won the silver medal in Courchevel, France, and then won their first JGP title in Zagreb, Croatia. They qualified for their first JGP Final in Sochi, Russia and finished 5th. They won the 2013 Russian junior title. They finished 4th at the 2013 World Junior Championships.

Programs 
(with Zenkova)

Competitive highlights 
(with Zenkova)

References

External links 

 
 Valerie Sinitsin at fskate.ru

Russian male ice dancers
1992 births
Living people
Figure skaters from Moscow